Joe Luxbacher (born February 10, 1951 in Beadling, Pennsylvania) is an American former soccer player and coach at University of Pittsburgh. He spent one season in the North American Soccer League and at least one in the American Soccer League.

Luxbacher graduated from Upper St. Clair High School before attending the University of Pittsburgh, graduating in 1974 with a bachelor's degree in biology. He also received from Pitt a masters in Physical Education and Recreation in 1978 and a PhD in Administration of Physical Education and Athletics in 1985. Luxbacher spent four seasons on the Pittsburgh Panthers men's soccer (Pitt Panthers) and holds school records for most goals(38), and points(84).

In 1974, he played five games with the Philadelphia Atoms in the North American Soccer League. In 1975, he played for the Pittsburgh Miners in the American Soccer League.  In the fall of 1976 Luxbacher served as an assistant coach with the University of Pennsylvania's men's soccer team.  In 1978, he became the head coach at Mount Union College, a position he held until 1981.  In addition to coaching Mount Union, Luxbacher also played for Pittsburgh Spirit in the Major Indoor Soccer League from 1979 to 1981.  In 1983, he returned to Pitt as an assistant and was elevated to head coach the next year.  He has coached at Pitt for 24 seasons, and is the school's second men's soccer coach.

In 23 years he has: compiled a 183–173–45 record; was the 1992 and 1995 Big East Coach of the Year; and his teams have posted 11 winning seasons, six 10 win seasons, and seven Big East Conference Tournament appearances. He has also written 15 books on coaching soccer.

Selected bibliography
Attacking Soccer, Joseph Luxbacher 
Soccer Practice Games 3E, Joseph Luxbacher 
Soccer: Steps to Success 3E, Joseph Luxbacher

References

External links
 Pitt coaching profile
 NASL stats
 Career stats

1951 births
Living people
American soccer coaches
American soccer players
American Soccer League (1933–1983) players
Major Indoor Soccer League (1978–1992) players
North American Soccer League (1968–1984) players
Philadelphia Atoms players
Pittsburgh Miners players
Pittsburgh Spirit players
Pittsburgh Panthers men's soccer coaches
Pittsburgh Panthers men's soccer players
University of Pittsburgh alumni
University of Mount Union
Soccer players from Pennsylvania
Association football forwards